Jùjú is a style of Yoruba popular music, derived from traditional Yoruba percussion. The name juju from the Yoruba word "juju" or "jiju" meaning "throwing" or "something being thrown". Juju music did not derive its name from juju, which is a form of magic and the use of magic objects, common in West Africa, Haiti, Cuba and other South American nations. It evolved in the 1900s in urban clubs across the countries, and was believed to have been created by Ababababaa Babatunde King, popularly known as Tunde King. The first jùjú recordings were by King and Ojoge Daniel in the 1920s, when King pioneered it. The lead and predominant instrument of jùjú is the Iya Ilu, talking drum.

Some juju musicians were itinerant, including early pioneers Ojoge Daniel, Irewole Denge and the "blind minstrel" Kokoro.

Afro-juju is a style of Nigerian popular music, a mixture of jùjú music and Afrobeat. Its most famous exponent was Shina Peters, who was so popular that the press called the phenomenon "Shinamania". Afro-juju's peak of popularity came in the early 1990s.

History
Following World War II, electric instruments began to be included, and pioneering musicians like Earnest Olatunde Thomas (Tunde Nightingale), Fatai Rolling Dollar, I. K. Dairo, Dele Ojo, Ayinde Bakare, Adeolu Akinsanya, King Sunny Adé., and Ebenezer Obey made the genre the most popular in Nigeria, incorporating new influences like funk, reggae and Afrobeat and creating new subgenres like yo-pop. Some new generation juju artistes include Oludare Olateju also known as  Ludare,  the  son  of Sabada juju music  creator; Emperor Wale Olateju and Bola Abimbola. Although juju music, like apala, sakara, fuji and waka was created by Muslim Yoruba, the music itself remains secular. King Sunny Adé was the first to include the pedal steel guitar, which had previously been used only in Hawaiian music and American country music.

Performance venue
Jùjú music is performed primarily by artists from the southwestern region of Nigeria, where the Yoruba are the most numerous ethnic group.  In performance, audience members commonly shower jùjú musicians with paper money; this tradition is known as "spraying". Shina Peters was awarded in 1990, but he was panned by music critics.

Music researcher Christpher Alan Waterman said that one of the centers of the performance of jùjú music is in Ibadan. Most jùjú musicians are based in the zone of market forces. There are several contexts in which jùjú music is performed. Music was performed at hotels, nightclub, and university. The Hotels serve music halls and dance halls also. Most activity takes place after nine p.m., and the hotels are the center of Ibadan's economic structure.

Another context in which jùjú music is played is at celebrations called àríyá. King Sunny Adé performed at àríyá with his socio aesthetics. These celebrations are parties which celebrate the naming of a baby, weddings, birthdays, funerals, title-taking, ceremonies and the launching of new property or business enterprises. Live music is crucial to the proper functioning of an àríyá.

See also
Music of Nigeria
List of juju musicians
Afrobeat
Femi Kuti

References

External links
King Sunny Ade interview by Jason Gross from Perfect Sound Forever site (June 1998)
"Sparkling Prince of Juju Music Called Ludare", Thisday, October 2016

African popular music
Nigerian music
Nigerian styles of music
Yoruba music